Wayland & Fennell was an architectural firm in Idaho.  Many of their works are listed on the U.S. National Register of Historic Places.

Charles W. Wayland (1874-1953) worked as a drafter in the office of Boise architect William S. Campbell for two years, 1900–1902, then became a partner when the firm was reorganized as Campbell & Wayland. The partnership was dissolved in 1904 when Wayland partnered with Fennell.

James A. Fennell (1874-1941) worked as a drafter in the office of San Francisco architect Alexander F. Oakey, then in the office of Butte, Montana, architect J.W. White. Fennell later formed Fennell & Cove in partnership with George B. Cove, headquartered in Butte. In 1904 Fennell relocated to Boise and formed the partnership Wayland and Fennell.

Works (attribution) include:
John P. Tate Building (1904), 1102 Main St., Boise, in the Lower Main Street Commercial Historic District 
Whipple Block (1904), 1106 Main St., Boise.  Demolished, but was in the Lower Main Street Commercial Historic District
Idaho Building (1905), Lewis and Clark Centennial Exposition hall, Portland, OR (Wayland & Fennell), demolished
Fremont County Courthouse (1909), 151 W. 1st St., N., St. Anthony, ID (Wayland & Fennell), NRHP-listed
Tiner Building (1910), 1010 Main St., Boise, a 4-story, Renaissance Revival building which housed the Boz Theater and the Manitou Hotel.  In the Lower Main Street Commercial Historic District.
Larson Building (1910), 1011 Main St., Boise, in the Lower Main Street Commercial Historic District 
Baugh Building (1916), 102 Main Avenue N., Twin Falls, Idaho, included in Twin Falls Downtown Historic District
Idaho Falls Public Library (1916), Elm and Eastern Sts., Idaho Falls, ID (Wayland & Fennell), NRHP-listed
Hopffgarten House (1923), 1115 W. Boise Ave., Boise, ID (Wayland & Fennell), NRHP-listed
Ada County Courthouse (1939), Boise, NRHP-listed
Idaho Power Substation, Van Buren St. and Filer Ave., Twin Falls, ID (Wayland & Fennell), NRHP-listed
Longfellow School, 1511 N. 9th St., Boise, ID (Wayland & Fennell), NRHP-listed
Nampa City Hall, 203 12th Ave., S., Nampa, ID (Wayland & Fennell), NRHP-listed
Roosevelt School, 908 E. Jefferson St., Boise, ID (Wayland & Fennell), NRHP-listed
St. James' Episcopal Mission Church, Reynolds St. (Old Co. Hwy. 91), Dubois, ID (Wayland and Fennell), NRHP-listed
Carrie Adell Strahorn Memorial Library, College of Idaho, Caldwell, ID (Wayland & Fennell), NRHP-listed
Bishop Daniel S. Tuttle House, 512 N. 8th St., Boise, ID (Wayland & Fennell), NRHP-listed
Whitney School, 1609 S. Owyhee St., Boise, ID (Wayland & Fennell), NRHP-listed
One or more works in South Eighth Street Historic District, Roughly bounded by 8th, 9th, Miller, and Broad Sts., Boise, ID (Wayland & Fennell), NRHP-listed
One or more works in West Warm Springs Historic District, Warm Springs Ave., Main, 1st, 2nd, and Idaho Sts., Boise, ID (Wayland & Fennell), NRHP-listed

See also
 List of companies based in Idaho

References

External links

Architecture firms of the United States
Architects from Idaho
Architecture firms based in Idaho